The InterContinental Miami  is a hotel in Downtown Miami, Florida, United States.

History 
It was opened in 1983 as the Pavillon Hotel, as part of developer Theodore Gould's waterfront Miami Centre project. However it was subject to foreclosure in 1985 which led to Intercontinental being selected to manage it. They were granted a long-term management contract the following year when it was renamed the Intercontinental Miami.

The hotel is managed by InterContinental Hotels Group and owned by Strategic Hotels & Resorts, which is owned by Anbang Insurance Group. Located on Biscayne Bay, the hotel is in the form of a 34-story tower on the eastern edge of downtown in Bayfront Park. The address is 100 Chopin Plaza. The building is 122 m (366 ft) tall, has 34 stories, and was built in 1982. There are 653 guest rooms.

Before the hotel was owned by InterContinental, it was known as Pavion Hotel. InterContinental took over ownership in 1986.

Designed in 1982 by noted architect Pietro Belluschi. The hotel's exterior, porte cochere and lobby were redesigned by architect Thomas Roszak, of Lohan Anderson + Roszak in 2012.

In the In 2012, it had a $30 million upgrade. In the same year, Chef Richard Sandoval was hired to provide Pan-Latin cuisine at the InterContinental Miami.

Gallery

See also 
 List of tallest buildings in Miami

References

Hotel buildings completed in 1982
InterContinental hotels
Hotels established in 1982
1982 establishments in Florida
Skyscraper hotels in Miami